Zhima Credit, also known as Sesame Credit, is a private credit scoring and loyalty program system developed by Ant Group, an affiliate of the Chinese Alibaba Group. It uses data from Alibaba's services to compile its score. Customers receive a score based on a variety of factors based on social media interactions and purchases carried out on Alibaba Group websites or paid for using its affiliate Ant Financial's Alipay mobile wallet. The rewards of having a high score include easier access to loans from Ant Financial and having a more trustworthy profile on e-commerce sites within the Alibaba Group.

History
Zhima Credit was introduced on 28 January 2015.  to be the first credit agency in China to use a score system for individual users, using both online and offline information. It was developed when the People's Bank of China lifted the restrictions and let non-bank institutes conduct personal credit information operations.

Usage
Baihe.com, a Chinese matchmaking company, uses Zhima Credit data as part of its service.

Technology platform
In 2015, Zhima Credit published information on the methodology behind its currently running beta version.

Zhima Credit's scoring system is roughly modeled after FICO scoring in the United States and Schufa in Germany.

Data collection
The corporate network of Zhima Credit, led by the Alibaba Group, spans over insurance, loan, historical payment, dating, shopping and mobility data. It collects data from all sources by utilizing the regulatory freedom it built from objects and social networks, public and private institutions and offline and online. The system is powered by "data from more than 300 million real-name registered users and 37 million small businesses that buy and sell on Alibaba Group marketplaces". Due to Zhima Credit’s close collaboration with the government, it also has access to all public documents, such as official identity and financial records.

Data distribution
Zhima Credit emphasizes its strict privacy and data protection, ensured through encryption and segregation. The firm also states that data is only gathered upon knowledge and consent of the user. According to Ant Financial, users’ scores can currently only be shared with their authorization or by themselves.

Data Structure
Big data and behavioral analytics are building blocks for the system. Data fragments are classified into five categories:

 Credit History: Reflects users’ past payment history and level of debt
 Fulfillment Capacity: Shows users’ ability to fulfill contract obligations
 Personal Characteristics: Examine the extent and accuracy of personal information
 Behavior and Preferences: Reveal users’ online behavior
 Interpersonal Relationships: Reflect the online characteristics of a users’ friends

The specifications of the algorithm that determine the classification, as well as the analytical parameters and indicators remain confidential. It is unclear is whether data is structured to build in tolerances for errors, for example the likelihood of a unit of data being false or from an unreliable source.

Data visualization
The five categories that Zhima Credit classifies its data into, have different weightings attached to them.  Based on those, an algorithm determines a citizen's final citizen score, ranked among others.  The scores in the ranking range from 350 (lowest trustworthiness) to 950 (highest trustworthiness).  From 600 up, one can gain privileges, while lower scorers will revoke them. According to current plans, the final score and ranking will be publicly available.

Relation to Social Credit System
The Social Credit System was introduced by the Chinese government and Alibaba promotes Sesame credit as a technology partner of the government's project. Initially, it was unclear how closely tied the Sesame credit is in relation to the national social credit system. 

In November 2017, Zhima Credit's general manager, Hu Tao, stated that no Zhima Credit data is shared with the Chinese government or other third parties without a user's consent. She also denied the company monitors social media content, or any other method,  to assess a customer's 'qualitative characteristics' for Zhima Credit.

In 2017, the Chinese government concluded that none of the pilots, which includes Sesame credit, will receive authorization as the official credit reporting system, due to concerns on conflicts of interest.

See also
 Tencent - also offers a credit scoring system

References

External links
 

Credit scoring
Financial services companies established in 2015
2015 establishments in China
Alibaba Group